The Ukrainian Workers' Party of Romania, also known as Vyzvolennia ("Liberation"), was a Romanian left-wing political organisation, active primarily in northern Bukovina, which militated for workers' and minority rights, and whose stated ultimate goal was uniting those areas of Romania with Ukrainian majority with the neighbouring Soviet Ukraine. Created in 1929 by members of the underground Communist Party of Bukovina and a major part of the Ukrainian section of the International Social Democratic Party, Vyzvolennia was associated throughout its existence with the Worker-Peasant Bloc, a front organisation for the then-illegal Communist Party of Romania. In spite of harassment from the Romanian authorities, the organisation was able to obtain several electoral gains in the late 1920s and early 1930s, including electing one of its members to the Parliament of Romania on the Bloc's list. Crackdown followed soon afterwards, with the party banned and most of its leadership imprisoned. Driven underground, the organisation ultimately disbanded in 1934.

1929 establishments in Romania
1934 disestablishments in Romania
Communist parties in Romania
Defunct communist parties
Defunct nationalist parties
Defunct socialist parties in Romania
History of Bukovina
Left-wing nationalist parties
Political parties disestablished in 1934
Political parties established in 1929
Political parties of minorities in Romania
Romanian Communist Party
Ukrainian diaspora in Romania